Robert Honiball (28 December 1874 – 14 January 1907) was a Jamaican cricketer. He played in four first-class matches for the Jamaican cricket team from 1894 to 1897.

See also
 List of Jamaican representative cricketers

References

External links
 

1874 births
1907 deaths
Jamaican cricketers
Jamaica cricketers
People from Saint Thomas Parish, Jamaica